Arthur Rikey Hogan (fl. 1850s–1860s) was an Irish clergyman and entomologist.

Hogan, who gained his M.A. at the University of Dublin,  was the curate of Corsham, from 1856–1858, curate of Piddleton, Dorset, from 1860–1863, then, after 1865,  Vicar of Watlington, Oxfordshire. He was one of the editors of the Natural History Review (the others were William Henry Harvey, Samuel Haughton, Alexander Henry Haliday and Edward Percival Wright). Hogan spent his last years in Italy with Haliday.
He was an Honorary Member of the Oxford Entomological Society

Works
Partial list 
A. R. Hogan. 1854. Catalogue of Coleoptera found in the neighbourhood of Dublin. Zoologist 12: 4195-4338
A. R. Hogan & A. H. Haliday. 1855 Notes on various insects captured or observed in the neighbourhood of Dingle, Co. Kerry, in July, 1854. Natural History Review 2: 50-55
A. R. Hogan. 1855. Catalogue of the Irish Microlepidoptera. Natural History Review 2: 109-115

References

 Crockford's Clerical Directory

Irish entomologists
Alumni of Trinity College Dublin
Year of death missing